Sayany may refer to

 Sayan Mountains
 the former name of Sayany-Khakassia, a bandy club in Russia
 4189 Sayany, a minor planet